2007 Emperor's Cup Final was the 87th final of the Emperor's Cup competition. The final was played at National Stadium in Tokyo on January 1, 2007. Kashima Antlers won the championship.

Match details

See also
2007 Emperor's Cup

References

Emperor's Cup
2007 in Japanese football
Kashima Antlers matches
Sanfrecce Hiroshima matches